Kotovsk is a town in Tambov Oblast, Russia, located on the Tsna River  south of Tambov. Population:

History
Kotovsk was founded before World War I under the initiative of Tsar Nicholas II as a settlement for workers who were engaged in the construction of the gunpowder factory (commissioned in 1912). Initially, it was called Porokhovoy Zavod (lit. gunpowder factory). It was later turned renamed Krasny Boyevik (lit. red fighter), because it was used by the Bolsheviks as a lodgement for the establishment of the Soviet government in the region. In 1940, it was granted town status and renamed Kotovsk after Grigory Kotovsky (1881–1925), who had suppressed an anti-Soviet peasant rebellion in Tambov Governorate in 1921.

The railway station was closed.

Administrative and municipal status
Within the framework of administrative divisions, it is incorporated as the town of oblast significance of Kotovsk—an administrative unit with the status equal to that of the districts. As a municipal division, the town of oblast significance of Kotovsk is incorporated as Kotovsk Urban Okrug.

Notable residents 

Margarita Plavunova (1994–2019), athlete and artists' model
Aleksandr Zyablov (born 1985), football player

References

Notes

Sources

Cities and towns in Tambov Oblast